The IMSA VP Racing Sportscar Challenge is a North American auto racing series for LMP3 and GT4 (run as the GSX class) vehicles. The series is sanctioned by IMSA and is usually run as support races for the IMSA SportsCar Championship. The series began in 2023 as a replacement for the IMSA Prototype Challenge series.

The IMSA VP Racing Sportscar Challenge retained LMP3 class cars from the Prototype Challenge series, but introduced GT4 cars to allow for multi-class racing. The series features two 45-minute races per event weekend with no mid-race pit stops or driver changes. The series is designed as a development series for other IMSA series, and as such drivers must have either a silver or bronze categorization from the FIA to participate.

The series is currently sponsored by VP Racing Fuels.

References

 
Auto racing series in the United States
Auto racing series in Canada
Sports car racing series
International Motor Sports Association
2023 establishments in the United States
Recurring sporting events established in 2023
GT4 (sports car class)